Scythris sinuosella is a moth of the family Scythrididae. It was described by Bengt Å. Bengtsson in 2002. It is found in Sudan, Yemen and Iran.

References

sinuosella
Moths described in 2002
Moths of Africa
Moths of the Middle East